The 1994 Oceania Junior Athletics Championships were held in Auckland, New Zealand, between February 23–26, 1994.  They were held together with the 1994 Oceania Open Championships. A total of 34 events were contested, 18 by men and 16 by women.

Medal summary
Complete results can be found as compiled by Bob Snow on the Athletics Papua New Guinea, on the Athletics Weekly, and on the World Junior Athletics History webpages.

Boys under 20 (Junior)

Girls under 20 (Junior)

Medal table (unofficial)

Participation (unofficial)
An unofficial count yields the number of about 143 athletes from 16 countries:

 (5)
 (25)
 (5)
 (24)
 (6)
 (2)
 (6)
 (29)
 (7)
 (4)
 (9)
 (1)
 (19)
/ (8)
 (1)
 (1)

References

Oceania Junior Athletics Championships
International athletics competitions hosted by New Zealand
Oceanian U20 Championships
1994 in New Zealand sport
1994 in youth sport
February 1994 sports events in New Zealand